Desulfobacterales are an order of sulfate-reducing bacteria within the phylum Thermodesulfobacteria. The order contains three families; Desulfobacteraceae, Desulfobulbaceae, and Nitrospinaceae. The bacterium in this order are strict anaerobic respirators, using sulfate or nitrate as the terminal electron acceptor instead of oxygen. Desulfobacterales can degrade ethanol, molecular hydrogen, organic acids, and small hydrocarbons. The bacterium of this order have a wide ecological range and play important environmental roles in symbiotic relationships and nutrient cycling.

Habitat 
Desulfobacterales are found globally and often in extreme environments, such as deep-sea hydrothermal vents, hot springs, marine sediment, and solfataric fields, an area of volcanic venting that gives off sulfurous gases.

Symbiotic Relationships 
Sulfate-reduction by Desulfobacteraceae and Desulfobulbaceae in coastal marine sediments plays an important role in molecular hydrogen cycling through a close relationship with fermenting microorganisms. Fermenting microbes break down organic materials on the seafloor and produce molecular oxygen and organic acids. Molecular hydrogen is an essential electron donor used by Desulfobacterales; they use the molecular hydrogen produced by fermentation to drive sulfate reduction. This feedback loop maintains molecular hydrogen at an energetically favorable level for fermenting respiration and provides ample molecular hydrogen for sulfate reduction.

Nitrogen Cycling 

Human activity, such as increased fertilizer use, has caused nitrogen pollution in inland and coastal waters. An influx of nitrogen inputs into aquatic ecosystems can cause negative effects such as eutrophication, resulting in anoxic conditions. Desulfobacterales are important in nitrogen pollution mitigation in coastal mangrove ecosystems through nitrate reduction. Nitrate is reduced by Desulfobacterales species via dissimilatory nitrate reduction genes. Dissimilatory nitrate reduction accounts for roughly 75.7–85.9% of nitrate reduction in mangrove ecosystems. Dissimilatory nitrate reduction is important because nitrate is reduced to ammonium, which can then be taken up by other microorganisms and plants in the system.

References